Epiphyas plastica is a species of moth of the family Tortricidae. It is found in Australia, where it has been recorded from Tasmania. The habitat consists of margins of wet forests at mid-altitudes.

The wingspan is about 17 mm.

The larvae feed on Cassinia aculeata.

References

Moths described in 1910
Epiphyas